Aliya (born 10 May 1992) is a Chinese actress of Mongolian ethnicity. She was educated at Shanghai Theatre Academy.  Her first play was the television series The Spring of Gallows in 2013. She also played leading roles in the web dramas In Tale of Flower and Gamer's Generation, and is also known for her supporting role in the fantasy television series Novoland: The Castle in the Sky.

Early life and education
Aliya was born in Inner Mongolia, China. In 2011, she enrolled as an undergraduate in Shanghai Theatre Academy, where she majored in acting. She worked part-time as a model.

Filmography

Awards and nominations

References

External links
 Aliya at Douban Movie

1992 births
Living people
Chinese television actresses
Chinese people of Mongolian descent
Shanghai Theatre Academy alumni
21st-century Chinese actresses
Actresses from Inner Mongolia